Keenagh or Kenagh is a village in County Longford, Ireland. It is situated on the R397 near the Royal Canal.

There are also GAA and soccer clubs in the village, as well as a community centre.

Corlea Trackway is an Iron Age trackway near the village.

The Newcomen Baronets  were the local landowners for several generations.

In the period 2000 to 2007 many new houses were built around Keenagh, due to the tax incentives available in the area and without direct consideration to demand. As of 2010, many were vacant or incomplete constituting ghost estates. Between the 2002 and 2016 census, the population of Keenagh more than doubled from 225 to 581 inhabitants.

See also
 List of towns and villages in Ireland
 Keenagh, Templeport, a townland in the parish of Templeport, County Cavan

References

Towns and villages in County Longford